Max Pécas (25 April 1925 in Lyon – 10 February 2003 in Paris) was a French filmmaker, writer and producer.

Pécas was assistant director to Jacques Daroy and others from 1948 to 1957. After making erotic movies and thrillers through the 1960s and 1970s, he shot several teen comedies, including the popular three-film "Saint-Tropez" series.  Many of his films are considered camp B-movies.

Some of Pécas's softcore films were imported to the U.S. by Radley Metzger.

Filmography

Director

1960 : Le Cercle vicieux with Claude Titre, Louisa Colpeyn
1961 : De quoi tu te mêles Daniela? (Daniella by Night) with Elke Sommer, Ivan Desny
1962 : Douce violence with Elke Sommer, Pierre Brice
1962 : Une femme aux abois with Claude Cerval, Sylvie Coste
1963 : Cinq filles en furie with Colette Régis
1964 : La Baie du désir (Erotic Touch) with Fabienne Dali, Sophie Hardy
1965 : Espions à l'affût with Jean Vinci, Claudine Coster, Robert Lombard
1966 : La peur et l'amour  with Claude Cerval, Véra Valmont
1968 : La Violence et l'amour
1968 : La Nuit la plus chaude (The Night of the Outrages) with Philippe Lemaire
1968 : The Black Hand  with James Harris, Janine Reynaud, Jean Topart
1970 : Claude et Greta (Any Time Anywhere / Her and She and Him) with Nicole Debonne, Astrid Frank
1971 : Je suis une nymphomane (I Am a Nymphomanic / Young Casanova / The Sensuous Teenager) with Sandra Julien
1973 : Je suis frigide... pourquoi ? (I Am Frigid... Why? / Let Me Love You) with Sandra Julien, Marie-Georges Pascal
1974 : Club privé pour couples avertis with Philippe Gasté, Anne Libert
1974 : Sexuellement vôtre (Sexually Yours / Young Casanova) with Valérie Boisgel, Henri Genès
1975 : Rêves pornos (archive footage)
1975 : Les Mille et une perversions de Felicia (1001 Perversions of Felicia) with Rebecca Brooke, Béatrice Harnois
1976 : Luxure (Everybodys / Sweet Taste of Honey) with Karine Gambier
1977 : Marche pas sur mes lacets with Sylvain Chamarande, Vanessa Vaylord
1978 : Embraye bidasse, ça fume with Sylvain Chamarande, Michel Vocoret
1979 : On est venu là pour s'éclater with Sylvain Chamarande, Olivia Dutron
1980 : Mieux vaut être riche et bien portant que fauché et mal foutu with Sylvain Chamarande, Victoria Abril
1981 : Belles, blondes et bronzées with Xavier Deluc, Ticky Holgado
1982 : On n'est pas sorti de l'auberge with Bernadette Lafont, Jean Lefebvre
1983 : Les Branchés à Saint-Tropez with Xavier Deluc, Ticky Holgado, Olivia Dutron
1985 : Brigade des mœurs with Pascale Roberts, Christian Barbier
1986 : Deux enfoirés à Saint-Tropez with Philippe Caroit, Caroline Tresca
1987 : On se calme et on boit frais à Saint-Tropez with Luq Hamet, Brigitte Lahaie

Screenwriter

La peur et l'amour (1966)
Belles, blondes et bronzées (1981)
Les Branchés à Saint-Tropez (1983)
Brigade des mœurs (1985)
Deux enfoirés à Saint-Tropez (1986)
On se calme et on boit frais à Saint-Tropez (1987)

Producer

Brigade des mœurs (1985)
Deux enfoirés à Saint-Tropez (1986)
On se calme et on boit frais à Saint-Tropez (1987)

External links

Mac Pecas Spirit, a fan page

1925 births
2003 deaths
French film directors
20th-century French screenwriters
Deaths from cancer in France